The John Deere 5220 is a utility/agricultural tractor produced by John Deere, designed for residential and farming use. Manufactured from 2000–2004, it has a 3-cylinder,  engine which produces  of torque at 2400 rpm. Its operating platforms where IOOS (Isolated Operators Operating Section), Cab, and Straddle Mount.

See also
John Deere
List of John Deere tractors

References

John Deere 5220. TractorData.com.

External links
John Deere.com - Agriculture

John Deere vehicles
Tractors
Vehicles introduced in 2000